Thomas Loraine McKenney (21 March 1785 – 19 February 1859) was a United States official who served as Superintendent of Indian Affairs from 1824–1830.

McKenny was born on March 21, 1785, in Hopewell, Maryland.  He was the oldest of five boys, and was raised and received his education at Chestertown, Maryland.  McKenney was a Quaker, which influenced his approach to interactions with Native Americans.

After the abolition of the U.S. Indian Trade program in 1822, then Secretary of War John C. Calhoun created a position without legislation within the War Department entitled Superintendent of Indian Affairs (this later became part of the Bureau of Indian Affairs).  McKenney was appointed to this position, and held it from 1824-1830.  McKenney was an advocate of the American Indian “civilization” program, becoming an avid promoter of removal of Indian bands and tribes to west of the Mississippi River. He liked to be referred to as "Colonel" by those around him.

Superintendent of Indian Trade/Superintendent of Indian Affairs 
McKenney was the Superintendent of Indian Affairs from 1824 to 1830. He oversaw trading houses that created goods that were traded for furs. After the abolition of the U.S. Indian Trade program in 1822, Secretary of War John C. Calhoun created a position legislation within the War Department entitled Superintendent of Indian Affairs (this evolved to the Bureau of Indian Affairs). He appointed McKenney to this position, who served from 1824-1830. McKenney was an advocate of the American Indian “civilization” program, becoming an avid promoter of Indian removal west of the Mississippi River. After being elected to office, President Andrew Jackson, who favored Indian removal, dismissed McKenney from his position in 1830 when Jackson disagreed with his opinion that “the Indian was, in his intellectual and moral structure, our equal.” (But it was also typical of new administrations to make their own political appointments.)

McKenney had helped support John C. Calhoun's bid for president in 1824; Calhoun rewarded him with a patronage position after being appointed as Secretary of War. While serving as Superintendent of Trade and Indian Affairs, McKenney helped gain passage of the Indian Civilization Act of 1819. Eleven years later, he helped draft and gain passage of the Indian Removal Act of 1830.

But McKenney also denounced the United States Government for failing to keep white people out of territory belonging to the Cherokee as part of a treaty. President Andrew Jackson dismissed McKenney from his position in 1830 when Jackson disagreed with his opinion that “the Indian was, in his intellectual and moral structure, our equal.”

History of the Indian Tribes of North America 

McKenney worked with James Hall along with Charles Bird King to create and publish the three volumes of the History of the Indian Tribes of North America, which were released from the years of (1836-1844). In 1821-1822 multiple delegates of various tribes visited Washington and while they were there McKenney took them to Charles Bird King who would paint their likeness. McKenney kept this going while working at the Department of War until he was fired, he then moved to Philadelphia to better work on the project. Once in Philadelphia the portraits were copied, in the end there were around 150 portraits.

Gallery of the History of the Indian Tribes of North America

Death and legacy 
After McKenny was fired he tried and failed to be appointed to the Whig administration of then president Zachary Taylor. McKenny would die in a Brooklyn boardinghouse alone with no wife or son, his family had already passed away by that point. He wrote the two volume work, History of the Indian Tribes of North America, With Biographical Sketches and Anecdotes of the Principal Chiefs.

McKenney died in New York City in February 1859.

References 
 McKenney, Thomas L. Memoirs, Official and Personal: Thomas L. McKenney. [1846] With Introduction by Herman J. Viola. Lincoln: University of Nebraska Press, 1973.
 Viola, Herman J. Thomas L. McKenney: Architect of America’s Early Indian Policy: 1816-1830. Chicago: The Swallow Press Inc., Sage Books. 1974.

Bibliography 

 Drinnon, Richard. “Facing West.” Google Books. Google. Accessed April 20, 2021. https://books.google.com/books?id=wrexPiqKo58C&q=Thomas%2BL.%2BMcKenney#v=snippet&q=Thomas%20L.%20McKenney&f=false.
 Fletcher, Carlton. “Home.” Glover Park History. Accessed April 20, 2021. https://gloverparkhistory.com/estates-and-farms/weston/thomas-l-mckenney-and-the-indians/.
 Viola, Herman J. “Diplomats in Buckskins.” Google Books. Google. Accessed April 20, 2021. https://books.google.com/books?id=FeGEhXY-4aEC&q=KENNY#v=onepage&q=mckenney&f=false.
 Viola, Herman J. “McKenney, Thomas Loraine (1785-1859), Government Official.” American National Biography. Oxford University Press. Accessed April 20, 2021. https://www.anb.org/view/10.1093/anb/9780198606697.001.0001/anb-9780198606697-e-0300320;jsessionid=7986B9412E2F498488536AE7EC415489.
 McKenney, Thomas L. Digital History. Accessed May 7, 2021. https://www.digitalhistory.uh.edu/disp_textbook.cfm?smtid=3&psid=679.

See also 

 U.S. Bureau of Indian Affairs
 History of the Indian Tribes of North America

1785 births
1858 deaths
American Quakers
People from Kent County, Maryland
United States Department of War officials
19th-century Quakers